The Republic of Korea–Australia Migratory Bird Agreement (ROKAMBA) is part of international efforts to conserve migratory birds of the East Asian – Australasian Flyway, along with bilateral migratory bird agreements between Australia and Japan (JAMBA, formed in 1974) and Australia and China (CAMBA, signed in 1986). These agreements provide a formal framework for cooperation on issues of mutual interest.

In April 2002, Australia and the Republic of Korea agreed to develop a bilateral migratory bird agreement similar to the JAMBA and CAMBA agreements. ROKAMBA was signed in Canberra on 6 December 2006 and came into force on 13 July 2007. Similar to the  JAMBA and CAMBA agreements, ROKAMBA formalises the relationship between Australia and the Republic of Korea in respect to the conservation of 59 species of migratory birds listed in the agreement and provides a basis for collaboration on the protection of their habitat.

Listed species

See also 
 Bonn Convention
 Convention on Biological Diversity
 China–Australia Migratory Bird Agreement
 East Asian – Australasian Flyway
 Environment Protection and Biodiversity Conservation Act 1999
 Japan–Australia Migratory Bird Agreement
 List of international environmental agreements

References

External links 
  ROKAMBA text - Austlii

Nature conservation in Australia
Environmental treaties
Migratory Bird Agreement
Bird conservation
Treaties of South Korea
Animal treaties
Treaties concluded in 2006
Treaties entered into force in 2007
2006 in Australia
2007 in the environment
Australia Migratory Bird Agreement
2007 establishments in Australia
2006 in Australian law
Bird migration